Produce 101 ( 101) was a 2016 girl group survival reality show on Mnet, and is the first season of the South Korean version of the franchise. It was a large-scale project in which the public "produces" a unit girl group by choosing members from a pool of 101 trainees from 46 entertainment companies as well as the group's concept, debut song, and group name. Produced by CJ ENM and Signal Entertainment Group for Mnet, the show had the second-largest budget of all shows broadcast by the latter at about four billion won (approximately $3.4 million).

Concept
Produce 101 is the nation's first agency-collaboration unit girl group project, which brings together 101 trainees from different entertainment companies both inside and outside of South Korea. From the 101 trainees, 11 will be selected to form a unit girl group. The unit group will perform four songs together for a year and release a debut album under the record label of CJ E&M but may later join a girl group that their agencies are planning. The trainees began dorming together on December 5, 2015. They took to the stage for their first group mission at the CJ E&M studio in Ilsan on December 27, 2015.

For the girls' training, several artists were recruited for the show: actor-singer Jang Keun-suk as a mentor, Brown Eyed Girls' vocalist JeA and Kim Sung-eun as vocal trainers, soloist Kahi with choreographer Bae Yoon-jung as dance trainers, and rapper Cheetah for rap training. Additionally, trainer Ray Yang was in charge of the girls' fitness training.

Pre-show promotions
Produce 101 was unveiled for the first time on Episode 453 of M! Countdown on December 17, 2015. The group was presented by Jang Keun-suk, and 98 out of 101 members showcased their talents through an EDM song "Pick Me".

From December 18 to December 25, 2015, the 101 participants were revealed via official website, Facebook, Instagram and Naver TV Cast. Each girl was introduced with a profile, photos, and video introductions.

On January 21, 2016, a production presentation for the show was held at the 63 Convention Center in Yeouido, Seoul. MC Jang Keun-suk, the five mentors, and 97 out of 101 trainees attended the presentation. During the event, it was revealed that the unit girl group from Produce 101 with eleven members would debut under YMC Entertainment.

Contestants

Color key (In order of contestant's rank on the show)

Episodes

Episode 1 (January 22, 2016)
The contestants enter the studio where 101 seats are arranged in a pyramid with a chair for the '#1' trainee at the top. They are introduced by their label and choose seats from 1 to 101. The contestants are then asked to perform by agency. Each individual trainee is judged based on their overall talents and are graded and organized into classes; A being the highest and F the lowest. At the end of the episode the popularity ranking is shown with JYP Entertainment's Ennik Somi Douma (Jeon So-mi) in first place.

Episode 2 (January 29, 2016)
After being grouped according to the grades given to the trainees, Jang Keun-suk announced that they will be performing on M! Countdown and are given the song "Pick Me" which they must learn in the following days. Their line distribution and overall participation in the performance will be decided from their groups, in which case A would have the most lines while F would be backup dancers. They are informed they will have 3 days to practice, and then be reassigned to their final groups after a re-evaluation. The trainees are filmed individually performing the song which will then be watched and evaluated by the mentors. They are then given their new grades and asked to move to their new rooms by grade. The episode ends with JYP's Jeon So-mi's name tag being shown on the screen, presumably to have been moved from group A.

Episode 3 (February 5, 2016)
The girls move to their new groups after the re-evaluations. They start rehearsing for their "Pick Me" stage where Fantagio's Choi Yoo-jung, who was moved from group D to A, was chosen as the center. After the performance, Jang Keun-suk announced the departure of 3 trainees from the show and also announced that the last 37 contestants on the rankings will be eliminated in the next episode. The trainees start their second mission, which is group performances with live audience. They are given the debut songs of ten girl groups: Wonder Girls; "Irony", KARA's "Break It", Girls' Generation's "Into the New World", After School's "AH", 2NE1's "Fire", 4Minute's "Hot Issue", f(x)'s "LA chA TA", SISTAR's "Push Push", Miss A's "Bad Girl Good Girl", and Apink's "I Don't Know". The girls in group A compete for each song through a race and are given the privilege of picking members from B,C,D, and F trainees to form their teams. Each song is performed live by two groups and each member is voted on separately by the live audience, combining the total scores to which group is the winner. This episode shows the groups rehearsing and assigning roles such as 'center', 'main vocal', 'second vocal', etc. Groups contain 4-5 members each. Their points from the live voting will be combined with their online votes which will then determine their scores. Members of the winning group will gain an extra 1000 points each.

Episode 4 (February 12, 2016)
The second half of the groups perform the respective songs and rehearsals for the groups are shown. During rehearsals of the groups performing f(x)'s "La chA TA", MBK Entertainment's Kim Danielle (Dani) and Clear Company's Ma Eun-jin both get sick and are unable to attend practice. Kim Dani quickly recovers from her fever, but Ma Eun-jin is forced to leave the show due to her health. After the last performance, the girls are shown their ranking based purely on their individual votes and the additional 1000 points for the girls of the winning teams, with Jellyfish Entertainment's Kim Se-jeong taking first place.

Episode 5 (February 19, 2016)
For this episode, Shin Bora, Heo Young-ji and Block B's Park Kyung appeared as special panelists. In between announcements of each girl's ranking during the first elimination, events leading up to the elimination are shown. Just after arriving at the dorms, the girls are taken to get flu shot. Weeks after, they were weighed and asked to do a series of exercises with the help of trainer Ray Yang. Some girls were put on a strict diet in order to lose weight. The trainees were also tricked into participating in a 'hidden camera'. The first is a consideration test to see who would be willing to help a staff struggling with two heavy packs of water bottles. The second is to see whether the participants would clean up the floor of a waiting room with coke spilling over. The third is a $30,000 camera which a staff pretends to break during a fake interview. The staff tells each trainee that she might get fired, and some girls take responsibility, pretending it was them who broke it. The 97 trainees choose the 'top visual'. Pledis Entertainment's Zhou Jieqiong takes first place while Jung Chae-yeon, Kim Do-yeon, Kim Se-jeong, Kim Ji-sung, Seo Hye-lin, Park Si-yeon, Kwon Eun-bean, Ki Heui-hyeon (Cathy), Lee Su-hyun, and Jeon So-mi takes 2nd to 11th place respectively. Jang Keun-suk then announces the top 20 trainees with Kim Se-jeong coming in 1st for the first ranking evaluation, and finally the 61st and last trainee, Happy Face Entertainment's Hwang A-young, who was saved from elimination.

Episode 6 (February 26, 2016)
Jang Keun-suk once again met up with the trainees to announce the next challenge. The trainees are tasked to perform live in groups based on positions they want to debut in: vocal, dance, or rap. There are six songs for vocals (Big Bang's "Monster", EXO's "Call Me Baby", Huh Gak and John Park's "My Best", GFriend's "Me Gustas Tu", Zion.T's "Yanghwa BRDG", and Tashannie's "Day by Day"), four songs for Dance (EXO's "Growl", Jessie J, Ariana Grande and Nicki Minaj's "Bang Bang", Destiny's Child's "Say My Name", and Sunmi's "Full Moon") and three songs for Rap (Verbal Jint's "You Look Happy", SMTM4's "Turtle Ship", and IKON's "Rhythm Ta"). Each song has a member limit and would be picked by each trainee based on their ranks, in which case Jellyfish Entertainment's Kim Se-jeong would have the privilege of choosing the song she wants to perform first and Happy Face Entertainment's Hwang A-young would automatically be placed in the empty slot. Jang Keun-suk also announced that only 35 trainees will remain in the next round and the winner from each category will receive 100,000 votes. The vocal teams are the first to perform and after each performance, they are ranked in their groups first and then overall in the category. Kim Se-jeong emerged as the winner in the vocal category.

Episode 7 (March 4, 2016)
The groups competing in the dance and rap category perform the respective songs and rehearsals for the groups are shown, with the "Bang Bang" group, composed of Choi Yoo-jung, Jeon So-mi, Kim Do-yeon, Kim Chung-ha, Kim Danielle, Kwon Eun-bean, and Kim Seo-kyung, receiving the show's first-ever encore call. Kconic Entertainment's Kim Hyeong-eun emerged the winner in the rap category, and Jellyfish Entertainment's Kang Mi-na emerged the winner in the dance category.

Episode 8 (March 11, 2016)
The girls are given an English lesson by trainer Lee Si-won through imitating and watching scenes of rapper Jessi on Unpretty Rapstar. Through a video recording, Jang Keun-suk then announces the beginning of the next evaluation prior to the second round of eliminations, meaning that all 61 girls that have survived so far will continue to practice for the performances, but not all of them may get to perform. The evaluation is revealed to be a concept evaluation, and the girls are given five original songs to choose from - EDM song "24 Hours" (produced by DJ Koo and Maximite, who previously produced "Pick Me"), girl crush pop song "Fingertips" (produced by Ryan Jhun), hip hop song "Don't Matter" (produced by San E), trap pop song "Yum-Yum" (produced by iDR), and girlish pop song "In the Same Place"(produced by B1A4's Jin-young) - with the winning team to receive a benefit of 150,000 votes. The girls choose their teams based on their category and individual ranking from the last evaluation. However, as only 14 people can be on one team (twice the amount that will be on the team after the elimination occurs), the first girl to have chosen a concept is given the right to kick out any extras, thus forcing them to choose another song. After practicing for the new songs, the girls undergo the second elimination, beginning with rank 34 up to 1, with Kim Se-jeong once again taking first place. Jang Keun-suk then announces the 35th and last trainee, SS Entertainment's Lee Su-hyun, who was saved from elimination.

Episode 9 (March 18, 2016)
Following eliminations, the teams are reorganized; groups with more than 7 members voted on whom to send to groups with less than 7 members. Jang Keun-suk announces that the evaluation will have an audience of 3000, far more than the 1000 they've had in previous evaluations. The girls resume practice, reassigning parts and meeting with the producers to record studio versions of their songs. On the day of the performances, several eliminated trainees are shown in the audience in support of the other girls. Both the "Yum-Yum" team (composed of Choi Yoo-jung, Jeon So-mi, Jung Chae-yeon, Kim Danielle, Park Si-yeon, Park So-yeon and Heo Chan-mi) and the "In the Same Place" team (composed of Kim Do-yeon, Kim So-hye, Yoo Yeon-jung, Yoon Chae-kyung, Han Hye-ri, Kim So-hee and Kang Si-ra) receive encore calls, but by a small margin of 30 audience votes, "In the Same Place" ultimately takes the win and the 150,000 vote benefit.

Episode 10 (March 25, 2016)
Amidst the eliminations, the girls undergo various lessons (make-up and speech), attend a therapy session to share about their current feelings, and participate in a question relay. They are also asked to pick the 5 most popular trainees amongst them, with Pledis Entertainment's Zhou Jieqiong taking 1st place and Kim Do-yeon, Jeon So-mi, Kim Chung-ha, and Lee Su-hyun taking 2nd to 5th place, respectively. At the elimination, Jang Keun-suk reveals that only 22 trainees will advance to the final stage. The girls are also shocked to discover huge differences in the rankings as a result of the new voting system and the 150,000 vote benefit from the concept evaluation, with various girls previously ranking within the top 11 falling near the bottom. With ranks 21 to 3 revealed, Kim Se-jeong and Jeon So-mi are called up as the contenders for 1st, with Jeon So-mi revealed to have won by a landslide. The contenders for 22nd place are then called up: Chorokbaem Juna's Ng Sze Kai and SS Entertainment's Lee Su-hyun. Lee Su-hyun once again barely survives being eliminated. With the top 22 confirmed, Jang Keun-suk announces the next and final mission: the debut song evaluation. He introduces "CRUSH" (produced by Ryan Jhun, who previously produced "Fingertips") as the final line-up's debut song. He explains that they will be split into two teams of 11, each team composed of one main vocal, eight sub vocals, and two rappers, with only Jeon So-mi's position as center confirmed due to having ranked 1st. The girls choose their positions beginning with rank 22 up to 1, with the higher ranked girls being given the advantage of replacing the lower ranked girls and bumping them into another position. After positions are confirmed, the girls begin practicing the choreography and memorizing the lyrics in preparation for the final stage.

Episode 11 (April 1, 2016)
The episode begins showing the girls' audition tapes, as well as their final confessional interviews. An announcement is then made that viewers will now be able to send SMS votes for one girl only, which will be added to the online votes in order to determine the final line-up. Throughout the episode, the trainee currently ranked 11th is revealed every now and then to encourage people to vote. The debut evaluation starts off with the eliminated trainees joining the top 22 for a performance of "PICK ME". Jang Keun-suk then reveals that the debut group, named I.O.I, will debut with a "unique" concept. The episode then flashes back to the guerilla concert held by the top 22 girls, where they performed their songs from the concept evaluation and eliminated trainee, Show Works' Hwang In-sun, acted as the MC. A high-five event had been held with the first 500 people that arrived at the concert, with Kim Se-jeong receiving the most high-fives.

The episode cuts to the girls recording "When the Cherry Blossoms Fade" (produced by B1A4's Jin-young who previously produced "In the Same Place"), which they perform at the evaluation. The girls are then shown preparing for their debut song, during which they surprise the trainers with thank you video messages, cake, and flowers. After the performance of "CRUSH", the episode cuts to the girls interviewing one another, undergoing group photoshoots, and finally, reading letters they had written to themselves from earlier episodes. Voting soon comes to a close, and ranking announcements begin. Lim Na-young, Kang Mi-na, Kim Do-yeon, Jung Chae-yeon, Zhou Jieqiong, Kim So-hye, Kim Chung-ha, and Choi Yoo-jung are announced as 10th to 3rd place, respectively, confirming them for debut. Again, Jeon So-mi and Kim Se-jeong are called up as contenders for 1st, and again, Jeon So-mi takes the win, confirming her position as I.O.I's center. The contenders for 11th, Star Empire Entertainment's Han Hye-ri and Starship Entertainment's Yoo Yeon-jung, are then announced with Yoo Yeon-jung ultimately being revealed to be I.O.I's final member.

Controversy
Controversy arose after Ilgan Sports leaked the contract terms between CJ E&M and the Produce 101 trainees' agencies to the public on February 16, 2016. According to the contract, the agencies and trainees are prohibited from legal action against manipulated edits made on the show and from revealing unreleased information. While the agencies share music production costs, trainees will not receive payment for participating in the show and CJ E&M will take half of any profits from Produce 101 music releases, with the agencies of members featured in the release sharing the remainder.

An affiliate of the show stated that "it [was] regrettable that the contents of the contract were revealed" and emphasized that the terms outlined in the contract are "legally common" and "made to protect the editorial rights of producers and to prevent any spoilers of the show."

Ranking
The top 11 contestants chosen through popularity online voting at Produce 101s homepage and audience's live voting, shown at the end of each episode. This ranking determined the 11 trainees who will form the unit girl group.

For the first and second voting period, viewers are allowed to select 11 trainees per vote, however on third round, the system changed to only one trainee per vote.

First voting period

Second and third voting period

Result

During the last episode aired on April 1, 2016, Jang Keun-suk announced the unit girl group's name: I.O.I.

Discography

Singles

Ratings
 In the table below,  represent the lowest ratings and  represent the highest ratings.
 N/A''' denotes that the rating is not known.

International broadcast
 In Japan, the first episode of Produce 101 aired via Mnet Japan on April 3, 2016, followed by 11 weeks of episodes every Friday starting on April 8.
 In the Asian and North American region, the first episode of Produce101 aired via Channel M on May 4, 2016, followed by 11 weeks of episodes every Wednesday starting May 11.

Aftermath

 I.O.I released its debut EP Chrysalis on May 4, 2016.
 Several group members resumed activities for their respective agencies:
Jung Chae-yeon (with label mate Ki Hee-hyun) came back as a member of DIA for their 1st EP Happy Ending on June 14, 2016.
 Kim Se-jeong and Kang Mi-na (with label mate Kim Na-young) debuted as members of Gugudan and released their debut EP Act. 1 The Little Mermaid on June 28, 2016. The group officially disbanded on December 31, 2020.
Yoo Yeon-jung was announced as the newest member of Korean-Chinese girl group Cosmic Girls and released their 2nd EP The Secret on August 17, 2016.
 Zhou Jieqiong and Lim Na-young debuted as part of girl group Pristin and released their first EP Hi! Pristin on March 21, 2017. Pristin officially disbanded on May 24, 2019. Zhou Jieqiong stayed with Pledis Entertainment, while Lim Na-young departed from the label.
 Zhou Jieqiong made her solo debut in China with the digital single "Why" on September 6, 2018.
 Jeon So-mi signed an exclusive contract with JYP Entertainment in January 2017 for solo activities. She left JYP in August 2018, and signed with The Black Label in September 2018. She debuted as a soloist on June 13, 2019 with single "Birthday".
 Kim Chung-ha appeared in soundtrack Strong Woman Do Bong-soon OST part 5 on March 17, 2017 and solo debuted EP Hands on Me on June 7, 2017 with title track "Why Don't You Know" featuring Nucksal.
 Choi Yoo-jung and Kim Do-yeon (with label mates Lee Seo-jung and Jung Haerim) debuted with girl group Weki Meki and released their debut EP Weme on August 8, 2017.
 Kim So-hye's family decided to buy out her contract with RedLine Entertainment, and then set up a new agency, S&P (Shark & Penguin) Entertainment.
 I.O.I's sub-unit released its single "Whatta Man" on August 8, 2016
 I.O.I released its final EP Miss Me? on October 17, 2016.
 I.O.I released its final single "Downpour" on January 18, 2017.
I.O.I was set to return in October 2019 with nine members, excluding Yoo Yeon-jung and Jeon So-mi, and was going to be co-managed by Swing Entertainment and Studio Blu. However the project was cancelled due to scheduling conflicts.

 I.B.I was formed by 5 eliminated trainees and released their 1st single "MOLAE MOLAE" on August 18. They are known as 'I.O.I's sister group' under LOEN Entertainment.
 Han Hye-ri (12th)
 Lee Su-hyun (13th)
 Kim So-hee (15th)
 Yoon Chae-kyung (16th)
 Lee Hae-in (17th)
 Lee Su-hyun (13th) left SS Entertainment in May 2016 after legal battle. 
 Kim So-hee (15th) of The Music Works, initially made it to the official contestant lineup for the Korean drama adaptation of the hit Japanese anime The Idolmaster but backed out. She later joined C.I.V.A alongside Yoon Chae-kyung. She debuted EP The Fillette on November 8, 2017 with title track "Sobok Sobok" featuring Yezi of Fiestar. She left The Music Works on July 11, 2019. She has then signed for n.CH Entertainment and joined Nature on October 8, 2019.
 Yoon Chae-kyung (16th) of DSP Media, released a digital single in collaboration with April's Chae-won, "Clock", in May 2016. In July 2016, she joined the mock girl group C.I.V.A, a result of the Mnet mockumentary The God of Music 2, as it released a remake of Diva's "Why Do You Call Me?". She was added as a member of DSP Media's girl group April on November 11, 2016.
Lee Hae-in (17th) left SS Entertainment in May 2016 after a month of legal battle. Along with Lee Su-hyun, she later made a cameo appearance on The God of Music 2. Hae-in will be a supporting actor in the 2016 remake of 1% of Anything. She also joined as a participant in Mnet's girl group survival show, Idol School.
 Eight trainees that were eliminated released the single "Don't give up" on September 28.
 Hwang In-sun (27th)
 Yoon Seo-hyeung (37th)
 Park Hae-young (38th)
 Hwang A-young (56th)
 Ham Ye-ji (72nd)
 Kim Mi-so (73rd)
 Heo Saem (now Soo-yeon) (75th)
 Pyun Kang-yoon (78th)
 Some eliminated trainees debuted in other girl groups:
 Ng Sze Kai (23rd) returned to her Hong Kong girl group As One (AS 1) and released the single "Hey Ya!" (헤이야) on May 4, 2016.
 Ki Hee-hyun (Cathy) rejoined DIA with label mate Jung Chae-yeon and later became the leader of the group. They released their 1st EP Happy Ending on June 14, 2016. 
 Kwon Eun-bin (35th) officially joined CLC in June 2016. The group disbanded on May 20, 2022.
 Park Hae-young, Kim Mi-so, and Heo Saem (now Soo-yeon) debuted with A.DE under 2able Company with their first single "Strawberry" on June 19, 2016.
 Kconic Entertainment's Kim Min-ji, Park Se-hee, Lee Jin-hee, and Kim Hyeong-eun debuted in 5 member group Bulldok with single "Why Not" on October 20, 2016.
 Pledis Entertainment trainees Gang Gyeong-won, Kim Min-kyeong, Kang Ye-bin, Park Si-yeon, and Jung Eun-woo released a digital single, "We", on June 28, 2016 and debuted as part of girl group Pristin and released their first EP Hi! Pristin on March 21, 2017. However, Pristin disbanded on May 24, 2019 with several of the members leaving Pledis Entertainment.
 Kim Tae-ha (50th) left Starship Entertainment to sign with Dublekick Entertainment and joined Momoland on April 4, 2017. However, it was announced on November 30, 2019 that she left the group and had terminated her contract with MLD Entertainment.
 Fantagio trainee Jung Hae-rim debuted with Weki Meki on August 8, 2017.
 Lee Seo-jeong (85th) left LOUDers Entertainment to sign with Fantagio. She appeared in Astro's "Confession" music video in November 2016 and debuted with Weki Meki on August 8, 2017.
 Lee Soo-min (31st) left Fantagio in April 2016, stating she was no longer interested in being an idol. She made an appearance as a contestant on Season 6 of K-pop Star. In April 2017, she signed with LOEN Entertainment. She appeared on the JTBC & YG Survival program called Mix Nine with the other LOEN trainees. LOEN is aiming to debut her in 2018 alongside fellow Produce 101 contestant Park So-yeon in a new girl group. She has left LOEN and signed with Mystic Story.
 Park So-yeon is preparing to debut 2018 with LOEN's girl group.
 Kim Ja-yeon (86th) left Happy Face Entertainment to sign with Trivus Entertainment and debuted as a member of 1NB on November 29, 2017.
 Some eliminated trainees debuted as solo singers:
 Hwang In-sun released the single "Emoticon" on April 28, 2016.
 Kim Woo-jung debuted under the name of D.A.L as a solo singer on August 4, 2016 with the single "Fireworks" featuring History's Kim Jae-ho under the name of Bignose.
 Kim Ju-na debuted as a solo singer on September 12, 2016 with the single "Summer Dream".
 Kang Si-ra released the single "Don't Wanna Forget" on January 18, 2017.
 Kang Si-won (36th) making her solo debut under TNK Entertainment. She made her solo debut in April, 2019 with the single "Click Click".
 Jeon So-yeon (20th) was in the line-up for another Mnet reality show, the female rap survival Unpretty Rapstar 3. and debuted on November 5, 2017 with the single "Jelly." She re-debuted with Cube Entertainment's new girl group (G)I-DLE.
 Kim Ji-sung and An Yoo-mi decided to take another route. Kim is now an actor trainee under N Company, while An stayed with Blessing Entertainment and is now a model.
 Choi Eun-bin (a.k.a. EB) and An Ye-seul are facing ongoing legal battles.
 Kim Si-hyeon (40th) signed with Yuehua Entertainment in April 2016. She then participated on Produce 48. She debuted with Everglow on March 18, 2019 and became leader of the group in 2021. 
 Kim Da-jeong (62nd) left Annyung Music Entertainment. On October 11, 2017 she debuted with the seven-member group  Hash Tag (해시태그). With Dajeong as the leader, they released their first EP The Girl Next Door'' with the lead single "ㅇㅇ" (Hue).
 Lim Hyo-sun joined girl group H.U.B and took part in The Uni+.
 Ng Sze Kai (23rd), Heo Chan-mi (26th), Lee Soo-min (31st), Park Hae-young (38th), Lim Jeong-min (57th), Kang Si-hyeon (61st), Kim Si-hyeon (69th) and Kim Yun-ji (84th) joined Mix Nine. Lee Soo-min made it into the line-up of the final female team, but the group lost to the male team.
 Lee Soo-min (31st) then left FAVE Entertainment and signed a contract with Mystic Story. She's now preparing to debut together with Suhyun (69th) and Miyu Takeuchi from Produce 48.
 Ham Ye-ji (72nd) is now under LCH Entertainment and debuted in the girl group Prism under the stage name Ham Ryeowon on May 4. 
 Lee Se-heun (93rd) debuted with girl group Girlkind on January 17, 2018.
 Choi Yu-bin (88th) debuted with girl group NATURE on August 3, 2018, under the stage name Chaebin. 
 Kim Seo-kyoung (30th) is currently under Kiwi Pop, a subsidiary of Kiwi Media Group, and debuted in girl group GWSN on September 5, 2018.
 Yu Su-a (53rd) is currently under Krazy Ent. She's a member of pre-debut girl group OAHSIS, and on November 16 she debuted in girl group AQUA.
 Park Min-ji (70th) joined Produce 48 with MND17. Then, she left MND17 and signed with Vine Entertainment. She debuted in girl group Secret Number on October 27, 2021.
 Lee Chae-lin (87th) left Midas Entertainment and signed with FENT (Fascino Entertainment). She debuted in girl group Fanatics on August 6, 2019.
 Kang Si-hyeon (61st) and Kim Yun-ji (84th) debuted in girl group Ariaz on October 24, 2019. The group is under Rising Entertainment, which is a sub-label of Star Empire Entertainment.
 Lim Jung-min (57th) debuted with girl group Lunarsolar on September 2, 2020, under the stage name Taeryeong.
 Kim Su-hyun (69th) debuted in girl group Billlie on November 10, 2021.

Franchise

References

External links
 

 
2016 South Korean television series debuts